Richard C. Berthurem (born January 24, 1943) is a retired lieutenant general in the United States Air Force. He was the commander of Allied Air Forces Southern Europe, Naples, Italy, and commander, 16th Air Force, United States Air Forces in Europe, Aviano Air Base, Italy. He was the air principal subordinate commander and the joint and combined forces air component commander for the North Atlantic Treaty Organization's (NATO) Southern Region. He was responsible for the planning and employment of NATO's air forces in the Mediterranean area of operations from Gibraltar to Eastern Turkey, and was the air commander for air operations in Bosnia-Herzegovina. He is also a former Commandant of Cadets at the USAF Academy.

Berthurem entered the Air Force in 1966 after graduating from the U.S. Air Force Academy, Colorado Springs, Colo. He commanded the 461st Fighter Squadron, Luke Air Force Base, Ariz.; 49th Fighter Wing, Holloman Air Force Base, N.M.; 831st Air Division, George Air Force Base, California; 4404th Composite Wing, Dhahran Air Base, Saudi Arabia; and the Air Warfare Center, Nellis Air Force Base, Nevada. He is a command pilot, having flown more than 4,300 hours in F-4, F-104, F-15 and F-16 aircraft, with 385 combat missions in Southeast Asia.

His awards include the Distinguished Service Medal, Legion of Merit, Distinguished Flying Cross with two oak leaf clusters, Meritorious Service Medal with two oak leaf clusters, Air Medal with 21 oak leaf clusters, Aerial Achievement Medal, Air Force Commendation Medal, Vietnam Service Medal with eight service stars, and the Republic of Vietnam Gallantry Cross with Palm.

References

1943 births
Living people
People from Green Bay, Wisconsin
United States Air Force Academy alumni
Military personnel from Wisconsin